Sheffield is an Anglo-Saxon surname, widespread mainly in the city of Sheffield in South Yorkshire, England (formerly in the West Riding of Yorkshire). The surname Sheffield's meaning is said to be originated from the city in South Yorkshire. 

Notable people with the surname include:

 Sheffield Baronets
 Bill Sheffield (1928-2022) American politician, governor of Alaska
 Bryan Sheffield (born 1978), American billionaire businessman, son of Scott
 Carrie Sheffield, American columnist, broadcaster and policy analyst
 Charles Sheffield (1935–2002), physicist and science fiction author
 David Sheffield (born 1948), American comedy writer
 Edward Sheffield (1908–1971), English cricketer
 Emily Sheffield (born 1973), British journalist, former editor of the Evening Standard
 Fred Sheffield (1923–2009), American basketball player
 Gary Sheffield (born 1968), Major League Baseball player
 Gary Sheffield (historian), military historian
 Grace Sheffield, fictional character in The Nanny
 J. D. Sheffield (born 1960), American politician
 Jack Sheffield (footballer) (1879–1915), English footballer
 Johnny Sheffield (1931–2010), American former child actor
 Jordan Sheffield (born 1995), American baseball player
 Joseph Earl Sheffield (1793–1882), railroad magnate and philanthropist
 Jeremy Sheffield (born 1966), English actor and former professional ballet dancer
 Justus Sheffield (born 1996), Major League Baseball player
 Karen Sheffield (born 1961), Canadian judo champion
 Kendall Sheffield (born 1996), American football player
 LaTanya Sheffield (born 1963), American hurdler
 Ralph Sheffield (born 1955), American politician
 Rob Sheffield (born 1966), American music journalist
 Robert Sheffield (1462–1518), English lawyer and member of parliament
 Roy Sheffield (1906–1997), English cricketer
 Samantha Sheffield (born 1971), wife of former UK Prime Minister David Cameron
 Scott D. Sheffield (born 1952/53), American businessman
 Skip Sheffield, an early ring name of American professional wrestler Ryan Reeves (born 1981), now better known as Ryback
 Tamie Sheffield (born 1970), American actress and model
 William Paine Sheffield, Sr. (1820–1907), U.S. Representative and Senator from Rhode Island
 William Paine Sheffield, Jr. (1857–1919), U.S. Representative from Rhode Island

English toponymic surnames